Oachira or Ochira is an ancient temple town located 32 km away from Kollam city in Karunagappally taluk, Kollam district in Kerala, India.

Temple town
Oachira is one of the famous sacred places of Kerala and in India. Oachira is on the border of Kollam and Allappuzha Districts, next to the National Highway 66 (NH 66). It is a very ancient pilgrimage center that is centered on the ParaBrahma Temple (that is dedicated to the Para Brahman (or Param Brahman) or Ohmkaram, the Universal Consciousness), which covers thirty-six acres of land. Oachira North Muslim Masjid is another historical monument near Oachira town.

Festivals
The major annual festivals are Oachira Kali or Oachirakali (held on the first and second of Midhunam, i.e., June–July) and the twelve-day Panthrandu Vilakku (twelve lamp festival), which is held in November/December.  Oachira Kali is celebrated in commemoration of the battle of Kayamkulam, fought between Marthanda Varma, the Maharaja of Travancore and the Raja of Kayamkulam, on the plains of Oachira. It is a mock fight enacted between groups of men dressed as warriors on the padanilam (battlefield). They perform a martial dance standing in knee-deep water, brandishing swords and shields, and splashing water in every direction. A big cattle fair is also held as part of the festival.

Yet another festival celebrated in Oachira Temple is the "Irupathiyettam Onam" (Thiruvonum in the month of Kanni, second month of Malayalam Calendar). It is considered the Onam of cows and bulls and is celebrated on Thiruvonam. These concepts are related to the agricultural prosperity of Onattukara.

Panthrandu vilakku (12 Lamps) festival
The "Panthrandu vilakku" festival celebrated at Oachira Parabrahma Temple is considered as the most reputed festivals of this temple. In the month of Vrishchikam, or Vrishchika Masam, is the fourth month in a traditional Malayalam calendar and is a highly auspicious month.Sabarimala Ayyappa Temple opens on the day for the two-month-long annual pilgrimage season. The first twelve days are celebrated as "Panthrantu vilakku"."Panthrandu vilakku" is being observed in temples with great fervour and enthusiasm to commemorate the ‘Ten Avatars of Lord Vishnu’ The Panthrandu vilakku celebrated at Oachira Parabrahma Temple is considered as the most reputed one At Ochira Para brahma temple, during "Panthrantu vilakku"  pilgrims reside in hundreds of  small huts for twelve days in the premises of  temple following religious rituals. Thousands of people stays  near a temple premises for a period of twelve days .This tradition  is one of its kind in Kerala .Lakhs of people visit the temple during this period. There are various religious programs and meetings are being conducted during this period. Days are filled with speeches of Eminent scholars, religious leaders and political leaders. In the night  cultural programmes of veteran artists are conducted. For pilgrims these days  will be truly rejuvenating experience.

There is no sanctorum in Oachira Temple. The statues of the deities are placed below large banyan trees; the Prasadam is holy mud from the temple, which supposedly has medicinal value.

The temple has a rich tradition of religious harmony, which is  open to people of all religion and faith. The main offering of the temple is 'Annadanam'-offering food to the poor.

Accommodation

The temple administration manages  two guest houses. Recently built guest house 'Omkaram' has 102 rooms with all modern amenities to cater to the needs of  pilgrims.

Celebrities
Cartoonist Shankar hails from near Oachira. The government of Kerala paid a tribute to him, in the form of  a museum near his birthplace Oachira. Kerala Lalithakala Akademi was behind the ambitious project, which costs an estimated initial cost of Rs. 3. 5 crore which spreads  over 15,000 sq.ft. of land.

Access
To reach Oachira, by air, the nearest airports are Trivandrum International Airport, which is 98 km away, and Cochin International Airport, which is 135 km away. By rail, the nearest station is Ochira railway station, just 1.5 km from town and Kayamkulam Junction is just 7 km away, all major express trains having stop here and  It is also near NH 66. Oachira is the gateway to Matha Amruthananda Mayi Devi Asramam (HQ) at Vallikkavu, which is just 3 km away.

Education
RVSM Higher Secondary School, situated at Prayar is the oldest and biggest educational institution in and around Oachira. Started in 1909, this school was elevated as a higher secondary school and boasts a lower primary division too. Students gaining entry at the LKG can complete their pre-university exams (now known as +2) and attend the graduation courses of universities. Oachira Govt. Higher Secondary School is another educational institution. Pragathi Hindi Vidyalay is another Hindi college in the region.

Places near Oachira
 Oachira Parabrahma Temple
Azheekal Beach
 Krishnapuram Palace

Notable people
 Cartoonist Shankar, political cartoonist
 K. P. Nambiathiri, photographer
 K. Surendran, Malayalam writer and Vayalaar Award winner
 S. Guptan Nair, Malayalam writer, literary critic, scholar, orator, essayist, lexicographer, translator and educator
 S. Ramachandran Pillai, C.P.I. (M) politburo member
 Prayar Gopalakrishnan, Ex MLA, Former President of Travancore Devaswom Board
 R. Gopakumar, visual artist, India's first major digital art collector
Geetha Salam , Malayalam film actor

References

External links

Cities and towns in Kollam district